The 2021–22 UEFA Europa Conference League was the inaugural season of the UEFA Europa Conference League, Europe's tertiary club football tournament organised by UEFA.

The final was played at the Arena Kombëtare in Tirana, Albania, with Roma defeating Feyenoord 1–0. As winners, Roma automatically qualified for the 2022–23 UEFA Europa League group stage, although they had already done so through their league position.

This season was the first since 1999–2000 (the first season after the dissolution of the UEFA Cup Winners' Cup) where three major European club competitions (UEFA Champions League, UEFA Europa League, and UEFA Europa Conference League) took place.

On 24 June 2021, UEFA approved the proposal to abolish the away goals rule in all UEFA club competitions, which had been used since 1965. Therefore, if in a two-legged tie, two teams scored the same number of aggregate goals, the winner was not decided by the number of away goals scored by each team, but always by 30 minutes of extra time, and if the two teams scored the same amount of goals in extra time, the winner was decided by a penalty shoot-out.

Association team allocation
A total of 181 teams from 54 of the 55 UEFA member associations participated in the 2021–22 UEFA Europa Conference League (the exception being Spain, as none of their teams finished third in the Europa League group stage). The association ranking based on the UEFA country coefficients was used to determine the number of participating teams for each association:
Associations 1–5 each had one team qualify.
Association 1 (Spain) did not have any team qualify for this season, as the team which would have participated, Villarreal, won the 2020–21 UEFA Europa League and earned a place in the 2021–22 UEFA Champions League.
Associations 6–15 and 51–55 each had two teams qualify.
Associations 16–50 (except Liechtenstein) each had three teams qualify.
As the UEFA Europa Conference League title holders' berth in the UEFA Europa League was vacant this season, association 16 (Cyprus) had their domestic cup winner promoted from the Europa Conference League to the Europa League, so they only had two teams qualify.
Liechtenstein had one team qualify (Liechtenstein organised only a domestic cup and no domestic league).
Moreover, 20 teams eliminated from the 2021–22 UEFA Champions League and 26 teams eliminated from the 2021–22 UEFA Europa League were transferred to the Europa Conference League.
For this season, only 19 teams eliminated from the 2021–22 UEFA Champions League were transferred, as there was one fewer team competing in the Champions Path qualifying of the 2021–22 UEFA Champions League.

Association ranking
For the 2021–22 UEFA Europa Conference League, the associations were allocated places according to their 2020 UEFA country coefficients, which took into account their performance in European competitions from 2015–16 to 2019–20.

Apart from the allocation based on the country coefficients, associations could have additional teams participating in the Europa Conference League, as noted below:
 – Additional/vacated teams transferred from/to the UEFA Champions League
 – Additional teams transferred from the UEFA Europa League

Distribution
The following is the access list for this season. In the default access list, the title holders of the Europa Conference League qualify for the Europa League group stage. However, since this berth was vacant this season, the following changes to the access list were made:
The cup winners of association 16 (Cyprus) enter the Europa League instead of the second qualifying round.
The cup winners of associations 30 (Slovakia) and 31 (Liechtenstein) enter the second qualifying round instead of the first qualifying round.

As Villarreal, which otherwise would have qualified for the Europa Conference League play-off round via their domestic league, won the 2020–21 UEFA Europa League, thereby earning an automatic spot in the Champions League group stage as the Europa League title holders, thus vacating a berth in the play-off round. The following changes were confirmed by UEFA:
The domestic cup winners of associations 17 (Switzerland) and 18 (Greece) enter the third qualifying round instead of the second qualifying round.
The domestic cup winners of associations 32 to 35 (Slovenia, Hungary, Luxembourg, Lithuania) enter the second qualifying round instead of the first qualifying round.

Moreover, in the default access list, originally 17 losers from the Champions League first qualifying round were transferred to the Europa Conference League second qualifying round (Champions Path). However, since the Champions League title holders, Chelsea, which were guaranteed a berth in the Champions League group stage, already qualified via their domestic league, only 16 losers from the Champions League first qualifying round were transferred to the Europa Conference League second qualifying round (Champions Path) after the Champions League access list was rebalanced. As a result, only 19 teams entered the Champions Path second qualifying round (one of the losers from the Champions League first qualifying round was drawn to receive a bye to the third qualifying round).

Teams

The labels in the parentheses show how each team qualified for the place of its starting round:
CW: Domestic cup winners
2nd, 3rd, 4th, 5th, 6th, etc.: League position of the previous season
LC: League cup winners
RW: Regular season winners
PW: End-of-season Europa Conference League play-offs winners
UCL: Transferred from the Champions League
Q1: Losers from the first qualifying round
PR: Losers from the preliminary round (F: final; SF: semi-finals)
UEL: Transferred from the Europa League
GS: Third-placed teams from the group stage
PO: Losers from the play-off round
CH/MP Q3: Losers from the third qualifying round (Champions/Main Path)
Abd-: League positions of abandoned season due to the COVID-19 pandemic in Europe as determined by the national association; all teams were subject to approval by UEFA as per the guidelines for entry to European competitions in response to the COVID-19 pandemic.

The second qualifying round, third qualifying round and play-off round were divided into Champions Path (CH) and Main Path (MP).

CC: 2021 UEFA club coefficients.

Three teams not playing in a national top division took part in the competition: Gagra (2nd tier), Sileks (2nd tier) and Vaduz (2nd tier).

Notes

Schedule
The schedule of the competition was as follows. Matches were scheduled for Thursdays apart from the final, which took place on a Wednesday, though exceptionally could take place on Tuesdays or Wednesdays due to scheduling conflicts (especially featuring teams from countries where there were very few sufficient stadiums, such as Gibraltar and Wales). Scheduled kick-off times starting from the group stage were 18:45 (instead of 18:55 previously) and 21:00 CEST/CET, though exceptionally could take place at 16:30 due to geographical reasons.

All draws started at 13:00 or 14:00 CEST/CET and were held at the UEFA headquarters in Nyon, Switzerland. On 16 July 2021, UEFA announced that the group stage draw would be held in Istanbul, Turkey.

Qualifying rounds

First qualifying round

Second qualifying round

Third qualifying round

Play-off round

Group stage

The draw for the group stage was held on 27 August 2021, 13:30 CEST (14:30 TRT), in Istanbul, Turkey. The 32 teams were drawn into eight groups of four. For the draw, the teams were seeded into four pots, each of eight teams, based on their 2021 UEFA club coefficients. Teams from the same association, and due to political reasons, teams from Azerbaijan and Armenia, could not be drawn into the same group. Prior to the draw, UEFA formed pairings of teams from the same association, including those playing in the Europa League group stage (one pairing for associations with two or three teams, two pairings for associations with four or five teams), based on television audiences, where one team was drawn into Groups A–D and another team was drawn into Groups E–H, so that the two teams would have different kick-off times.

The matches were played on 14 and 16 September, 30 September, 21 October, 4 November, 25 November, and 9 December 2021. The winners of each group advanced to the round of 16, while the runners-up advanced to the knockout round play-offs. The third-placed and fourth-placed teams were eliminated from European competitions for the season.

Alashkert, Bodø/Glimt, Flora, Kairat, Lincoln Red Imps, Mura, Randers and Union Berlin made their debut appearances in a UEFA competition group stage. Alashkert, Flora and Lincoln Red Imps were the first teams from Armenia, Estonia and Gibraltar, respectively, to play in a UEFA competition group stage.

Group A

Group B

Group C

Group D

Group E

Group F

Group G

Group H

Knockout phase

In the knockout phase, teams played against each other over two legs on a home-and-away basis, except for the one-match final.

Bracket

Knockout round play-offs

Round of 16

Quarter-finals

Semi-finals

Final

Statistics
Statistics exclude qualifying rounds and play-off round.

Top goalscorers

Top assists

Team of the Season
The UEFA technical study group selected the following players as the team of the tournament:

Player of the Season
  Lorenzo Pellegrini ( Roma)

Young Player of the Season
  Luis Sinisterra ( Feyenoord)

See also
2021–22 UEFA Champions League
2021–22 UEFA Europa League
2021–22 UEFA Women's Champions League
2021–22 UEFA Youth League

References

External links

 
3
2021-22